Augusta Legge, Countess of Dartmouth (18 February 1822 – 1 December 1900), born Lady Augusta Finch, was an English philanthropist.

Brought up in Warwickshire, she was the daughter of Heneage Finch, 5th Earl of Aylesford, and his wife, the former Lady Augusta Sophia Greville, daughter of George Greville, 2nd Earl of Warwick.

She married William Legge, 5th Earl of Dartmouth, on 9 June 1846. They had two sons, William Legge, 6th Earl of Dartmouth (1851–1936), and the Honourable Sir Henry Legge (1852–1924), and four daughters, who died unmarried.

In 1853, she founded a Birmingham school in her former residence, Sandwell, when she and her husband moved to Patshull Hall, near Wolverhampton. Laetitia Frances Selwyn ran Sandwell School which was open to girls to train as domestic servants. By the time it closed in 1891 it had extended its range to governesses and even industrial jobs irrespective of gender.

She became a widow and she dedicated herself to good works including founding a local Mother's Union and a home for orphan boys. She crossbred chickens to create the Andalusian Bantam.

She died at Woodsome Hall near Huddersfield in 1900.

References 

1822 births
1900 deaths
English philanthropists
English women philanthropists
People from Warwickshire
British countesses
Daughters of British earls
19th-century British philanthropists
19th-century women philanthropists